Wajid Zia is a Pakistani civil servant and police officer who served as BPS-22 grade as the Director General of the Federal Investigation Agency, from November 2019 to June 2021. He has previously served as the Inspector General of Railway Police. He first rose to prominence when he headed the joint investigation team to probe the Panama Papers case in 2017. He belongs to Tehsil Murree of District Rawalpindi.

Career
Wajid Zia is ancy. He was appointed as DG FIA by Prime Minister Imran Khan in November 2019.

He has previously served as Inspector General of Railway Police. He first rose to prominence when he headed the joint investigation team to probe the Panama Papers case in 2017. Zia has previously served as the FIA additional director general (immigration) and twice in the Intelligence Bureau and Motorway Police. He also worked in the Economic Crimes Wing of the FIA.

See also
Hussain Asghar
Rizwan Ahmed
Allah Dino Khawaja
Jawad Rafique Malik
Moazzam Jah Ansari

References 

Year of birth missing (living people)
Living people
Pakistani civil servants
Government of Pakistan
Pakistani government officials
Directors General of the Federal Investigation Agency